In advertising, a tear sheet is a page cut or torn from a publication to prove to the client that the advertisement was published. Media buying agencies are often required by clients to provide tear sheets along with a post analysis of any advertising campaign. With the emergence of online advertising, tear sheets often now appear in the form of a PDF file, known as a "virtual tear sheet" or "electronic tear sheet". Tear sheets are also used by writers, models, and photographers as proof that their work was published. Some advertisers also use tear sheets as a form of direct mail marketing, which aims to cultivate a feeling of authenticity by appearing to be sent by an individual.

In finance, a tear sheet provides a one-page summary of a company or portfolio, containing current and historic information on the company such as market cap, sector, graph of historic share price.  They can also be referred to as "Fund Fact Sheets" or "Ditos".

In the United States Department of Defense, a tear sheet is a draft message (e.g. memo or email) a subordinate writes for and sends to a superior for review, editing, and sending.

References

External links 
Online dictionary
Example tear sheet

Publishing
Investment